Churchill, Hitler and the Unnecessary War: How Britain Lost Its Empire and the West Lost the World is a book by Patrick J. Buchanan, published in May 2008. Buchanan argues that both world wars were unnecessary and that the British Empire's decision to join the wars had a disastrous effect globally. One of Buchanan's expressed purposes is to undermine what he described as a "Churchill cult" in America's elite. Buchanan focuses particularly on how Winston Churchill helped influence Britain into the world wars with Germany in 1914 and in 1939.

Synopsis 
Buchanan argues that it was a great mistake for Britain to fight Germany in both world wars, which he argues was a disaster for the whole world.

World War I 
Buchanan argues that Britain had no quarrel with Germany before 1914, but the great rise of the Imperial German Navy, spearheaded by Admiral Alfred von Tirpitz, was a "threat to Britain" that led the British to bring back to European waters the bulk of its Royal Navy and to make alliances with Russia and France. Buchanan asserts that was a disastrous policy that "tied England to Europe" and created the conditions that led the British to involvement in the war.

On the other hand, Buchanan asserts that the greatest responsibility for the breakdown in Anglo-German relations was the "Germanophobia" and zeal for the Entente Cordiale with France of the British Foreign Secretary, Edward Grey.  In assessing responsibility for the course of events, Buchanan asserts that the British could have easily ended the Anglo-German naval arms race in 1912 by promising to remain neutral in a war between Germany and France.

Buchanan calls "Prussian militarism" an anti-German myth invented by certain British statesmen and that the record of Germany supports his belief that it was the least militaristic of the European Powers. Buchanan says that until 1914, German Kaiser Wilhelm II had not fought in a war but Winston Churchill had served in three wars: "Churchill had himself seen more war than almost any soldier in the German army."

Buchanan claims that Wilhelm was desperate to avoid a war in 1914 and accepts the German claim that it was the Russian mobilization of July 31 that forced war on Germany. Buchanan accuses Churchill and Grey of getting Britain to enter the war in 1914 by making promises that Britain would defend France without the knowledge of Cabinet or Parliament. 

Buchanan calls the British "hunger blockade" of Germany in World War I "criminal" and accepts the argument of British economist John Maynard Keynes, who wrote in his 1919 The Economic Consequences of the Peace that the reparations that were imposed on Germany in the Treaty of Versailles were "impossible" to pay.

World War II 
Buchanan hypothesizes that World War II could have been avoided if the Treaty of Versailles had not been so harsh toward Germany. Buchanan views the treaty as unjust toward Germany and argues that German efforts to revise Versailles were both moral and just. As a result of their humiliation at Versailles, Germans became more nationalistic and ultimately put their confidence in Adolf Hitler. Buchanan argues that Britain, France, Italy, and Czechoslovakia all indirectly assisted Hitler's rise to power in 1933. 

Weimar-era German leaders like Gustav Stresemann, Heinrich Brüning, and Friedrich Ebert were all responsible German statesmen, according to Buchanan, and were working to revise Versailles in a manner that would not threaten the peace of Europe, but they were undermined by the inability and unwillingness of Britain and France to cooperate.  Buchanan calls Hitler's foreign policy program more moderate than the war aims authorized by German Chancellor Theobald von Bethmann Hollweg in the Septemberprogramm in World War I. Buchanan contends that Hitler was interested in expanding into only Eastern Europe and did not seek territory in Western Europe and Africa. Moreover, Buchanan argues that once Hitler came to power in 1933, his foreign policy was not governed strictly by Nazi ideology but was modified ad hoc by pragmatism.

Buchanan says that Hitler regarded the Franco-Soviet Pact as an aggressive move directed at Germany and that it violated the Locarno Treaties, and he adds that Hitler had a strong case. Hitler utilized the claim of the violation of Locarno as a diplomatic weapon against which the French and the British had no answer. Buchanan argues that Hitler's public demands on Poland in 1938 and 1939, namely the return of the Free City of Danzig to the Reich, "extra-territorial" roads across the Polish Corridor, and Poland's adherence to the Anti-Comintern Pact were a genuine attempt to build an anti-Soviet German-Polish alliance, especially since Buchanan argues that Germany and Poland shared a common enemy, the Soviet Union. Buchanan claims that Hitler wanted Poland as an ally against the Soviet Union, not an enemy.

Buchanan agrees with British historian E. H. Carr, who said in April 1939 about the Polish "guarantee": "The use or threatened use of force to maintain the status quo may be morally more culpable than the use or threatened use of force to alter it." Buchanan maintains that Hitler did not want a war with Britain and that Britain should not have declared war in 1939 on an Anglophile Hitler who wanted to ally the Reich with Britain against their common enemy the Soviet Union.Buchanan calls the Morgenthau Plan of 1944 a genocidal plan for the destruction of Germany that was promoted by the vengeful Henry Morgenthau and his deputy, Soviet agent Harry Dexter White, a way of ensuring Soviet domination of Europe, with Churchill being amoral for accepting it.

Buchanan argues that the Holocaust would not have developed the scale that it did without Hitler's invasion of Poland and then the Soviet Union, as he would not otherwise have been in control of most European Jews. Buchanan argues that if Churchill had accepted Hitler's peace offer of 1940, the severity of the Holocaust would have been greatly reduced.Endorsing the concept of Western betrayal, Buchanan accuses Churchill and Roosevelt of turning over Eastern Europe to the Soviet Union at the Tehran Conference and the Yalta Conference.

Buchanan also writes that the United States should have stayed out of the events of World War II. However, because the United States insisted for the United Kingdom to sever the Anglo-Japanese Alliance in 1921, Japan ultimately aligned itself with the Axis and later attacked Pearl Harbor. Buchanan blames Churchill for insisting to the British Cabinet in 1921 to give in to pressure to end its alliance with Japan.

Buchanan ends his book with an attack on former President George W. Bush and argues that just as Churchill led the British Empire to ruin by causing unnecessary wars with Germany twice, Bush led the United States to ruin by following Churchill's example in involving the United States in an unnecessary war in Iraq, and he passed out guarantees to scores of nations in which the United States has no vital interests, which placed his country in a position with insufficient resources to fulfil its promises. Finally, Buchanan highlights the symbolism of Bush placing a bust of Churchill in the Oval Office as evidence that Bush's neoconservative foreign policy was influenced and inspired by Churchill.

Reviews 
The book was sixteenth on its first week on The New York Times bestseller list. MSNBC observed that Buchanan joins historians who are more critical of British involvement in World War II.

The book has received mostly negative reviews. Canadian journalist Eric Margolis in the Toronto Sun endorsed Buchanan's study as a "powerful new book." Margolis wrote that neither Britain nor the United States should have fought in World War II and that it was simply wrong and stupid that millions of people died to stop the 90% German Free City of Danzig from rejoining Germany. Margolis accepts Buchanan's conclusion that the British "guarantee" of Poland in March 1939 was the greatest geopolitical blunder of the twentieth century.

Jonathan S. Tobin in The Jerusalem Post gave Buchanan's book a negative review and suggested the author is antisemitic and representative of a "malevolent" form of appeasement. American writer Adam Kirsch, in The New York Sun, attacked Buchanan for using no primary sources, and for saying there was a conspiracy by historians to hide the truth about the two world wars. Kirsch acidly remarked that if that was the case, Buchanan did not need only secondary sources to support his arguments. He accused Buchanan of hypocrisy for denouncing Churchill as a racist who was opposed to non-white immigration to Britain while demanding the same in the United States. He wrote that Buchanan's apocalyptic language about the West in decline owed more to Oswald Spengler than to American conservatives. He also argued that Buchanan's heavy reliance on Correlli Barnett's 1972 book The Collapse of British Power as a source reflects the fact that both Buchanan and Barnett are two embittered conservatives unhappy with the way history worked out, and they prefer to talk about how much nicer history would have been if Britain had not fought in the two world wars or the United States and Britain in Iraq.

In a hostile review, the American journalist David Bahnsen called Buchanan's book an "anti-semitic piece of garbage" and accused Buchanan of being unique in that he posited the Holocaust as an understandable, if excessive, response to the British "guarantee" of Poland in 1939.

British journalist Geoffrey Wheatcroft, in a review in The New York Review of Books, complained that Buchanan had grossly exaggerated the harshness of the Treaty of Versailles by observing that most historians think that Germany started World War I and that Buchanan's criticism of the British "area bombing" of cities in the war pays no attention to how limited Britain's options seemed to Churchill in 1940. Wheatcroft wrote that Buchanan cited right-wing British historians like Alan Clark, Maurice Cowling, and John Charmley when they stated that Britain should never have fought Germany or at least should have made peace in 1940, but he ignored the wider point that Clark, Cowling and Charmley were making: they viewed the United States rather than Germany as the British Empire's main rival.

Hungarian-American historian John Lukacs, in a review in The American Conservative, compared Buchanan to David Irving and argued that the only difference between the two was that Irving used lies to support his arguments while Buchanan used half-truths. Lukacs commented that Buchanan cites the left-wing British historian A.J.P. Taylor only when it suits him; when Taylor's conclusions are at variance with Buchanan's views, Buchanan does not cite him. Lukacs objected to Buchanan's argument that Britain should have stood aside and allowed Germany to conquer Eastern Europe as Buchanan ignores just how barbaric and cruel Nazi rule was in Eastern Europe in World War II. Finally, Lukacs claimed that Buchanan has often been accused of Anglophobia. Lukacs felt that Buchanan's lament for the British Empire was a case of crocodile tears. Lukacs concluded that Buchanan's book was not a work of history but was a thinly-veiled admonitory allegory for the modern United States with Britain standing in for the United States; and Germany, Japan, and Italy standing in at various points for modern Islam, China, and Russia.

British journalist Christopher Hitchens, in a review in Newsweek, claimed that Buchanan ignored the aggression of Imperial Germany and said Wilhelm openly encouraged Muslims to wage jihad against the Western colonial powers during World War I, conducted the Herero and Namaqua Genocide in German South-West Africa, and supported the Young Turks government while it committed the Armenian genocide. Hitchens argued that Imperial Germany was dominated by a "militaristic ruling caste" of officers and Junkers who recklessly sought conflict at every chance, and that it was simply nonsense for Buchanan to write of Germany being "encircled" by enemies on all sides before World War I.

See also

 John Charmley
The Death of the West
Hitler's War

References

Sources
 .

External links
 .
"Nazis 'offered to leave western Europe in exchange for free hand to attack USSR'". The Daily Telegraph. London,
 "Churchill's War" by David Irving – lecture on YouTube

2008 non-fiction books
Anti-British sentiment
Books about Adolf Hitler
Books about foreign relations of the United Kingdom
Books about international relations
Books by Patrick J. Buchanan
English-language books
History books about World War I
History books about World War II
History books about the United Kingdom
Non-fiction books about diplomacy
Non-fiction books about war
Non-interventionism
Opposition to World War II
Paleoconservative publications
Winston Churchill